Stefan Dotzler (born 10 December 1960 in Munich) is a German cross-country skier who competed from 1982 to 1988.  At the 1984 Winter Olympics in Sarajevo, he finished sixth in the 4 × 10 km relay, 30th in the 15 km event and 37th in the 30 km event. He also participated in the 1988 Winter Olympics in Calgary, finishing 40th in the 30 km event.

Dotzler's best World Cup career finish was third in a 15 km event in West Germany in 1983.

He trained his son Hannes Dotzler.

Cross-country skiing results
All results are sourced from the International Ski Federation (FIS).

Olympic Games

World Championships

World Cup

Season standings

Individual podiums

1 podium

References

External links

 Stefan Dotzler at sports-reference.com

1960 births
Cross-country skiers at the 1984 Winter Olympics
Cross-country skiers at the 1988 Winter Olympics
German male cross-country skiers
Living people
Olympic cross-country skiers of West Germany